Volodymyr Yaksmanytskyi (born 4 February 1977) is a retired Ukrainian football defender.

References

External links
 

1977 births
Living people
Ukrainian footballers
FC Shakhtar-2 Donetsk players
FC Shakhtar Donetsk players
FC Stal Alchevsk players
FC Metalurh Donetsk players
FC Mariupol players
FC Kryvbas Kryvyi Rih players
FC Zorya Luhansk players
Ukrainian Premier League players
Ukrainian First League players
Ukrainian Second League players
Ukrainian Amateur Football Championship players
Association football defenders